Jonas Pär Bergqvist (born 26 September 1962) is a Swedish former professional ice hockey right winger, who twice won an Olympic medal in his career.

Playing career
Bergqvist played for Rögle BK and Leksands IF between 1981 and 1989.  He played 22 games in the NHL for the Calgary Flames in 1989–90.  He then played in Germany for Mannheimer ERC before returning to Leksands IF in 1991, where he played until 1998.  He won the Golden Puck as the top player in Sweden in 1995–96.  In 1998–99 he played for VEU Feldkirch in Austria, winning the Alpine championship.

Bergqvist held the record for games played – 272 – for the Swedish national team, prior to his record being broken by Jörgen Jönsson in 2007.  He participated in nine IIHF World Championships (on the gold medal team in 1987, 1991 and 1998), the 1988 and 1994 Olympics, the 1987 and 1991 Canada Cups, and the 1996 World Cup of Hockey.

Career statistics

Regular season and playoffs

International

Sources
A to Z Encyclopedia of Ice Hockey

Record broken by J. Jönsson

1962 births
Living people
Calgary Flames draft picks
Calgary Flames players
Leksands IF players
Ice hockey players at the 1988 Winter Olympics
Ice hockey players at the 1994 Winter Olympics
Medalists at the 1988 Winter Olympics
Medalists at the 1994 Winter Olympics
Olympic bronze medalists for Sweden
Olympic gold medalists for Sweden
Olympic ice hockey players of Sweden
Olympic medalists in ice hockey
People from Hässleholm Municipality
Rögle BK players
Salt Lake Golden Eagles (IHL) players
Swedish expatriate ice hockey players in Canada
Swedish ice hockey right wingers
Sportspeople from Skåne County